Charles Peter Wroth (1929–1991) was a British Civil Engineer, a world pioneer in Geotechnical Engineering and Soil Mechanics. He led the design and construction of the Hammersmith flyover.

Education
Wroth was educated at Marlborough College and Emmanuel College, Cambridge, where he studied Engineering and carried out research in Soil Mechanics under Kenneth H. Roscoe, leading to the award of a PhD degree in 1958 with his thesis titled "The behaviour of soils and other granular media when subjected to shear". He served as Professor at the University of Oxford and the University of Cambridge. He also served as Master of Emmanuel College for a brief period prior to his death.

Academic recognition
He delivered the 24th Rankine Lecture, titled "The interpretation of in situ soil tests".

Cricket
Wroth played county cricket at amateur level, playing minor counties cricket for Devon from 1947–50, and later for Cambridgeshire in 1962.

References

1929 births
1991 deaths
Alumni of Emmanuel College, Cambridge
Masters of Emmanuel College, Cambridge
British civil engineers
Rankine Lecturers
English cricketers
Devon cricketers
Cambridgeshire cricketers